The 1969 Libyan Constitution was brought into force on 11 December 1969 by the Revolutionary Command Council, in the name of the Arab people of the Libyan Arab Republic. The constitution would remain in force until the adoption of the interim constitution on 3 August 2011.

See also
 Declaration on the Establishment of the Authority of the People

External links
 Text of the Constitution 

Defunct constitutions
Constitutions of Libya
1969 documents